Kaji Abhiman Singh Rana Magar was an army general and Minister of Nepal until September 15, 1846, and the first victim of the Kot massacre of 1846. According to a government letter to then-British Resident, Major Lawrence in Kathmandu, 32 Bhardars (Nobles) were killed in the massacre catapulting Jung Bahadur, who later became Rana, to power.

Historians have written about Abhiman Singh Rana Magar from different angles:  some saying that he was not very interested in becoming Prime Minister of the country. However, few others contesting otherwise have written the queen had favoured him also.

Birth, childhood and education 

No records so far are available as to who his parents were, birthplace, childhood and education also. But it can be fairly said that he was a 'literate person' because his signatures can be found in the government papers jointly signed together with then Prime Ministers Bhimsen Thapa and Mathabarsingh Thapa also.

Prime Ministerial contender 

The British Resident to Nepal Major Lawrence's letter, paragraph four,  of August 26, 1845, to British Government clearly states that General Abhiman Singh Rana Magar was also a prime ministerial contender as the seat had fallen vacant since sometime already. But he seemed to be 'declining the dangerous office'. (Stiller 1981:285).

In another letter to his government on September 23, 1845, Resident Lawrence wrote,  a council of minister was formed consisting of "Chautaria Fatteh Jung and Kazis Gagan Singh, Abhiman Rana and Dalbhanjan Pandey" . Minister Abhiman Singh Rana Magar, retaining his job in the army as general, had two regiments under him. He was Mulki Dewan, which would mean a minister responsible for home affairs: managing internal affairs east of Palpa.

The Kot Massacre, September 15, 1846 

General Gagan Singh Bhandari was mysteriously killed while he was worshipping some deity at his residence on September 14, 1846.  The Queen Laxmi Devi ordered all Bhardars to report themselves to the Kot, at present day Hanuman Dhoka in Kathmandu.  The furious Queen, as a wounded lioness, ordered out loud to bring in front of her and punish whoever might have killed General Gagan Singh. ("The queen was addressing her agitation to the assemblage including Prime Minister Fatteh Jung Shah, and General Abhiman Singh Rana Magar" ) Jung Bahadur's gesture toward Kaji Bir Keshar Pande(a rival of Kazi Gagan Singh Bhandari) prompted the dangerously enraged Queen to order Abhiman Singh Rana to sever the former's head. The reason probably because, he was then interior minister - 'Mulki Dewan' of the country. But Abhiman Singh Rana Magar begged King's approval to execute the job. A heated debate followed and the situation turned so tense and dangerous, Abhiman Singh Rana Magar wanted to dash out. A sepoy at the gate blocked and bayoneted at his chest. The dying Abhiman Singh Rana Magar wrote a letter in Nepali 'Ja' on the Kot wall with the blood gushing out of his chest suggestive of Jung Bahadur Rana being the culprit. In the government letter to the British resident in Kathmandu 32 Bhardars are listed as killed but the number should have been far more than stated.

References 
 Kot massacre
 Rana, B. K. 2003 : A Concise Magar History (संक्षिप्त मगर इतिहास - २०५९)  : Raj Tribandhu, Pingansthan Kathmandu, Nepal.
 Stiller, Ludwig F. 1981 : The Kot Massacre (Letter from Kathmandu): Nepal and Asian Studies, Tribhuvan University, Kirtipur.
 History Lessons Nepal: Absolution For His Brother's Sins

1846 deaths
Nepalese military personnel
Year of birth missing